Tarrenz is a municipality in the Imst district and is located 3.60 km north of Imst at the lower course of the Gurgl brook. The village is an agriculture community with emphasis in sheep breeding and a settlement for commuters. In the last years Tarrenz was able to increase its economy and also to beautify the picture of the village. It has 2785 inhabitants (01.01.2022).

Population

Gallery

References

External links

Lechtal Alps
Mieming Range
Cities and towns in Imst District